Acadia University is a public, predominantly undergraduate university located in Wolfville, Nova Scotia, Canada, with some graduate programs at the master's level and one at the doctoral level. The enabling legislation consists of the Acadia University Act and the Amended Acadia University Act 2000.

The Wolfville Campus houses Acadia University Archives and the Acadia University Art Gallery. Acadia offers over 200 degree combinations in the faculties of arts, pure and applied science, professional studies, and theology. The student-faculty ratio is 15:1 and the average class size is 28. Open Acadia offers correspondence and distance education courses.

, Peter J. Ricketts is Acadia's current president.

History
 Acadia began as an extension of Horton Academy (1828), which was founded in Horton, Nova Scotia, by Baptists from Nova Scotia and Queen's College (1838). The college was later named Acadia College. Acadia University, established at Wolfville, Nova Scotia in 1838 has a strong Baptist religious affiliation.
It was designed to prepare men for the ministry and to supply education for lay members.

The two major Universities of the day in Nova Scotia were heavily controlled by denominational structures. King's College (University of King's College) was an Anglican school and Dalhousie University, which was originally non-denominational, had placed itself under the control and direction of the Church of Scotland. It was the failure of Dalhousie to appoint a prominent Baptist pastor and scholar, Edmund Crawley, to the Chair of Classics, as had been expected, that really thrust into the forefront of Baptist thinking the need for a college established and run by the Baptists.

In 1838, the Nova Scotia Baptist Education Society founded Queen's College (named for Queen Victoria). The college began with 21 students in January 1839. The name "Queen's College" was denied to the Baptist school, so it was renamed "Acadia College" in 1841, in reference to the history of the area as an Acadian settlement. Acadia College awarded its first degrees in 1843 and became Acadia University in 1891, established by the Acadia University Act.

The Granville Street Baptist Church (now First Baptist Church (Halifax)) was an instrumental and determining factor in the founding of the university. It has played a supporting role throughout its history, and shares much of the credit for its survival and development. Many individuals who have made significant contributions to Acadia University, including the first president John Pryor, were members of the First Baptist Church Halifax congregation. Similarly, the adjacent Wolfville United Baptist Church plays a significant role in the life of the university.

The original charter of the college stated:

This was unique at the time, and a direct result of Baptists being denied entry into other schools that required religious tests of their students and staff.

In 1851, the power of appointing governors was transferred from the Nova Scotia Baptist Education Society to the Baptist Convention of the Maritime Provinces.

Charles Osborne Wickenden (architect) and J.C. Dumaresq designed the Central Building, Acadia College, 1878–79.

Clara Belle Marshall, from Mount Hanley, Nova Scotia, became the first woman to graduate from Acadia University in 1879.

In 1891, there were changes in the Act of Incorporation.

Andrew R. Cobb designed several campus buildings including: Raynor Hall Residence, 1916; Horton House, designed by Cobb in the Georgian style, and built by James Reid of Yarmouth, Nova Scotia was opened in 1915 as Horton Academy. Today, Horton Hall is the home of the Department of Psychology and Research and Graduate Studies.  Emmerson Hall, built in 1913, is particularly interesting for the variety of building stones used. In 1967 Emmerson Hall was converted to classrooms and offices for the School of Education. It is a registered Heritage Property. 

Unveiled on 16 August 1963, a wooden and metal organ in Manning Chapel, Acadia University, is dedicated to Acadia University's war dead of the First and Second World Wars and the Korean War. A book of remembrance in Manning Chapel, Acadia University was unveiled on 1 March 1998 through the efforts of the Wolfville Historical Society

In 1966, the Baptist denomination relinquished direct control over the university. The denomination maintains nine seats on the university's Board of Governors.

Acadia is a laureate of Washington's Smithsonian Institution and a part of the permanent research collection of the National Museum of American History. Acadia is also the only Canadian University selected for inclusion in the Education and Academia category if the Computerworld Smithsonian Award.

Faculty strikes

Acadia University's Board of Governors and members of the Acadia University Faculty Association (AUFA) have ratified a new collective agreement covering the period 1 July 2010 to 30 June 2014. The faculty of Acadia University have been on strike three times in the history of the institution. The first was 24 February to 12 March 2004. The second was 15 October to 5 November 2007. The second strike was resolved after the province's labour minister, Mark Parent, appointed a mediator, on 1 November, to facilitate an agreement. The third strike began on 1 February 2022 and ended 1 March 2022 with both sides agreeing to binding arbitration.

Academics

Rankings
In Maclean's 2023 Guide to Canadian Universities, Acadia was ranked fifth in the publication's "primarily undergraduate" Canadian university category, tied with Bishop's University. In the same year, the publication ranked Acadia 33rd, in Maclean's reputation survey.

Faculties
Acadia is organized into four faculties: Arts, Pure & Applied Science, Professional Studies and Theology. Each faculty is further divided into departments and schools specialized in areas of teaching and research.

Research
Acadia has over 15 research centres and 6 research chairs. Undergraduate students have the opportunity to participate in many research opportunities in a small university setting.

The Division of Research & Graduate Studies is separate from the faculties and oversees graduate students as well as Acadia's research programs.

Acadia's research programs explore coastal environments, ethno-cultural diversity, social justice, environmental monitoring and climate change, organizational relationships, data mining, the impact of digital technologies, and lifestyle choices contributing to health and wellness. Acadia's research centres include the Tidal Energy Institute, the Acadia Institute for Data Analytics, and the Beaubassin Field Station. Applied research opportunities include research with local wineries and grape growers, alternative insect control techniques and technologies.

Innovation

The Acadia Advantage

In 1996, Acadia University pioneered the use of mobile computing technology in a post-secondary educational environment.

This academic initiative, named the Acadia Advantage, integrated the use of notebook computers into the undergraduate curriculum and featured innovations in teaching. By 2000, all full-time, undergraduate Acadia students were taking part in the initiative. The initiative went beyond leasing notebook computers to students during the academic year, and included training, user support and the use of course-specific applications at Acadia that arguably revolutionized learning at the Wolfville, N.S. campus and beyond.

Because of its pioneering efforts, Acadia is a laureate of Washington's Smithsonian Institution and a part of the permanent research collection of the National Museum of American History. It is the only Canadian university selected for inclusion in the Education and Academia category of the Computerworld Smithsonian Award.

In addition, Acadia University received the Pioneer Award for Ubiquitous Computing. In 2001, it achieved high rankings in the annual Maclean's University Rankings, including Best Overall for Primarily Undergraduate University in their opinion survey, and it received the Canadian Information Productivity Award in 1997 as the first university in Canada to fully utilize information technology in the undergraduate curriculum.

In October 2006, Dinter-Gottlieb established a commission to review the Acadia Advantage learning environment 10 years after inception. The mandate of the commission was to determine how well the current Advantage program meets the needs of students, faculty, and staff and to examine how the role of technology in the postsecondary environment has changed at Acadia, and elsewhere. The commission was asked to recommend changes and enhancements to the Acadia Advantage that would benefit the entire university community and ensure its sustainability.

Some of the recommendations coming from the Acadia Advantage Renewal Report included developing a choice of model specifications and moving from Acadia-issued, student-leased notebook computers to a student-owned computer model.

The university was also advised to unbundle its tuition structure so that the cost of an Acadia education is more detailed and students can understand how their investment in the future of the school is allotted.  In September 2008, Acadia moved to a student-owned notebook computer version of the Acadia Advantage, now named Acadia Advantage 2.0.

In 2017, Acadia announced the Huestis Innovation Pavilion as part of its $22.25 million Science Complex renewal project. Named in honour of lead donors, Faye and David Huestis of Saint John, New Brunswick, the Pavilion is a connection between Elliott and Huggins Halls, providing research and commercialization space.

The new Agri-Technology Access Centre in the Innovation Pavilion provides companies and industry organizations with access to specialized technology, lab space, subject-matter expertise and commercialization support services. It also enables Acadia to advance its applied research strength in a priority sector – agriculture – and expand its technology transfer and commercialization activities. The Science Complex renewal project was supported by an investment of $15.98 million by the Federal and Provincial governments.

Athletics
Acadia's sports teams are called the Axemen and Axewomen. They participate in the Atlantic University Sports conference of U Sports.

School spirit abounds with men's and women's varsity teams that have delivered more conference and national championships than any other institution in Atlantic University Sport. Routinely, more than one-third of Acadia's varsity athletes also achieve Academic All-Canadian designation through Canadian Interuniversity Sport by maintaining a minimum average of 80 per cent.

Expansion and modernization of Raymond Field was completed in the fall of 2007 and features the installation of an eight-lane all-weather running track and a move to the same premium artificial turf used by the New England Patriots of the National Football League for its main playing field. The Raymond Field modernization was a gift to the university by friends, alumni, and the province. War Memorial Gymnasium also saw the installation of a new playing floor to benefit its basketball and volleyball teams.

In September 2006, Acadia University announced its partnership with the Wolfville Tritons Swim Club and the Acadia Masters Swim Club to form the Acadia Swim Club and return competitive swimming to the university after a 14-year hiatus. On 26 September 2008, the university announced its intention to return swimming to a varsity status in September 2009.

Fight song
Notable among a number of songs commonly played and sung at various events such as commencement, convocation, and athletic games are: Stand Up and Cheer, the Acadia University fight song. According to 'Songs of Acadia College' (Wolfville, NS 1902–3, 1907), the songs include: 'Acadia Centennial Song' (1938); 'The Acadia Clan Song'; 'Alma Mater - Acadia;' 'Alma Mater Acadia' (1938) and 'Alma Mater Song.'

Symbols
In 1974, Acadia was granted a coat of arms designed by the College of Arms in London, England. The coat of arms is two-tone, with the school's official colours, garnet and blue, on the shield. The axes represent the school's origins in a rural setting, and the determination of its founders who cleared the land and built the school on donated items and labour. The open books represent the intellectual pursuits of a university, and the wolves heads are a whimsical representation of the university's location in Wolfville.  "In pulvere vinces" (In dust you conquer) is the motto.

The university seal depicts the Greek goddess of wisdom Athena in front of the first college hall.

The university also uses a stylized "A" as a logo for its sports teams.

Notable among a number of fight songs commonly played and sung at various events such as commencement, convocation, and athletic games are: the Acadia University alma mater set to the tune of "Annie Lisle". The lyrics are:

Far above the dykes of Fundy
And its basin blue
Stands our noble alma mater
Glorious to view

Lift the chorus
Speed it onward
Sing it loud and free
Hail to thee our alma mater
Acadia, hail to thee

Far above the busy highway
And the sleepy town
Raised against the arch of heaven
Looks she proudly down

Historic buildings at Acadia University
Seminary House, also known as the Ladies' Seminary, is a Second Empire style-building constructed in 1878 as a home for women attending the university.  It was designated a National Historic Site of Canada in 1997 as Canada's oldest facility associated with the higher education of women.

Carnegie Hall, built in 1909, is a large, two-storey, Neo-classical brick building.  It was designated under the provincial Heritage Property Act in 1989 as its construction in 1909 signified Acadia's evolution from classical college to liberal university.

The War Memorial House (more generally known as Barrax), which is a residence, and War Memorial Gymnasium are landmark buildings on the campus of Acadia University. The Memorial Hall and Gymnasium honours students who had enlisted and died in the First World War, and in the Second World War. Two granite shafts, which are part of the War Memorial Gymnasium complex at Acadia University, are dedicated to the university's war dead. The War Memorial House is dedicated to the war dead from Acadia University during the Second World War.

Student life

At Acadia University, students have access to the Student Union Building which serves as a hub for students and houses many Student Union organizations. The building houses The Axe Lounge, a convenience store, an information desk, two food outlets, and the Sexual Health Resource Centre. The university press, The Athenaeum is a member of CUP. There is a student-ran radio, available at https://www.axeradio.net/. Faculty and staff are known to ignore all requests by students. Faculty provides little to no support to students.

Student government

All students are represented by the Acadia Students' Union.

Residences

Approximately 1500 students live on-campus in 11 residences:
 Chase Court
 Chipman House
 Christofor Hall
 Crowell Tower (13 Story High-rise)
 Cutten House
 Dennis House - First floor houses student health services
 Eaton House
 Roy Jodrey Hall
 Seminary House - Also houses the School of Education in lower level
 War Memorial (Barrax) House
 Whitman Hall (Tully) - All female residence
 Willett House (former residence)

People

List of presidents and vice chancellors

 John Pryor, 1846–1850
 John Cramp, 1851–1853 (and 1856–1869)
 Edmund Crawley, 1853–1856
 John Cramp, 1856–1869
 Artemas Wyman Sawyer, 1869–1896
 Thomas Trotter, 1897–1906
 W.B. Hutchinson, 1907–1909
 George Barton Cutten, 1910–1922
 Frederic Patterson, 1923–1948
 Watson Kirkconnell, 1948–1964
 James Beveridge, 1964–1978
 Allan Sinclair, 1978–1981
 James Perkin, 1981–1993
 Kelvin Ogilvie, 1993–2004
 Gail Dinter-Gottlieb, 2004–2008
 Tom Herman (Acting President), 2008–2009
 Ray Ivany, 2009 – 2017
 Peter J Ricketts, 2017

List of chancellors

Alex Colville, 1981–1991
William Feindel, 1991–1996
Arthur Irving, 1996–2010
Libby Burnham, 2011–2018
Bruce Galloway, 2018–present

Notable alumni
 Edgar Archibald, scientist and politician
 Norman Atkins, Canadian senator
Solomon Adeniyi Babalola - Veteran Nigerian Baptist Missionary/Evangelist, Church Pastor, Church Administrator, Denominational Leader, and Theological Educator
 Ron Barkhouse, MLA for Lunenburg East (Horton Academy)
 Gordon Lockhart Bennett, Lieutenant-Governor of Prince Edward Island
 Arthur Bourns, President of McMaster University
 Libby Burnham, lawyer, Chancellor of Acadia University
 Bob Cameron, football player
 Dalton Camp, journalist, politician and political strategist
 M. Elizabeth Cannon, University of Calgary's President & Vice-Chancellor
 Lillian Chase, physician
 Paul Corkum, physicist and F.R.S.
 John Wallace de Beque Farris, Canadian senator
 Mark Day, actor
 Michael Dick, CBC-TV Journalist
 Charles Aubrey Eaton (1868–1953), clergyman and politician 
 William Feindel, neurosurgeon
 Dale Frail, astronomer
 Rob Ramsay, actor
 Alexandra Fuller, writer
 Gary Graham, musician, choral conductor
Matthew Green, Member of Parliament
 Milton Fowler Gregg, VC laureate, politician
 Robbie Harrison, Nova Scotian politician and educator
 Richard Hatfield, Premier of New Brunswick
 Charles Brenton Huggins, Nobel Laureate
 Kenneth Colin Irving, industrialist
 Robert Irving, industrialist
 Ron James, Canadian comedian
 Lorie Kane, LPGA golfer
 Gerald Keddy, Member of Parliament
 Joanne Kelly, Actress
 Kenneth Komoski, Educator
 David H. Levy, astronomer
 Peter MacKay, lawyer, Canadian Minister of National Defense
 Henry Poole MacKeen, Lieutenant-Governor of Nova Scotia
 Paul Masotti, football player
 Harrison McCain, industrialist
 Donald Oliver, Canadian senator
 Henry Nicholas Paint (1830–1921), member of Parliament, merchant, landowner,
 Freeman Patterson, photographer, writer
 Robert Pope, Visual artist author,
 Keith R. Porter, Cell Biologist
 Heather Rankin, singer-songwriter, member of The Rankin Family
 Perry F. Rockwood, radio evangelist
 Erin Roger, scientist
 Jacob Gould Schurman, President of Cornell University
 Roger Tomlinson (1933–2014), geographer and "The Father of GIS"
 Rev. William A. White, noted black minister and missionary
 Rev. William Pearly Oliver, noted black minister and educator 
 Lance Woolaver, playwright

Honorary graduates
 Jean Béliveau, professional hockey player and executive
 Rt. Hon. Kim Campbell, former Prime Minister of Canada
 Alex Colville, painter and former University Chancellor
 Rt. Hon. John Diefenbaker, former Prime Minister of Canada
 Rick Hansen, activist and Paralympic athlete
 Grace Hopper, computer scientist and United States Navy rear admiral
 Kyle Lowry, professional basketball player for the Miami Heat
 Alexa McDonough, politician and first woman to lead a major, recognized political party in Canada
 William Twaits, chairman and CEO of Imperial Oil Limited
 Rev. William A. White, noted black minister and missionary

See also
Acadia Divinity College
Canadian government scientific research organizations
Canadian industrial research and development organizations
Canadian Interuniversity Sport
Canadian university scientific research organizations
Higher education in Nova Scotia
List of universities in Nova Scotia
List of National Historic Sites of Canada in Nova Scotia

References

Further reading
Longley, R. S. Acadia University, 1838–1938. Wolfville, N.S.: Acadia University, 1939.

External links

Campaign for Acadia

 
Education in Kings County, Nova Scotia
Universities in Nova Scotia
Educational institutions established in 1838
Buildings and structures in Kings County, Nova Scotia
1838 establishments in Nova Scotia
Maple League